Love Valley is a town in Iredell County, North Carolina, United States. It also extends into Alexander County on its western end. The population was 90 at the 2010 census, and in 2016 the estimated population was 104.

History 
Love Valley is a small town located in a remote valley in the Brushy Mountains of northwestern North Carolina. Its creation in 1954 marked the fulfillment of a dream for founder Andy Barker. Barker developed two visions as a young man—he wanted to build a Christian community, and he wanted to be a cowboy. In 1954 he combined those visions to create an Old West-style village in the hills of northwestern Iredell County. The town was chartered in 1963.

Modeled after the Old West towns seen in countless Hollywood films, Love Valley boasts a saloon, general store, hitching posts, and rodeos. Automobiles are not allowed inside the town limits; people still use horses and horse-drawn vehicles to travel in the town. A small, nondenominational Christian church sits on a hill overlooking the town, thus emphasizing Barker's vision of a Christian utopia. The town garnered its share of controversy in the 1960s and 1970s, including around the "Love Valley Rock Festival", which local farmers complained brought drug addicts and other "troublemakers" to the area. However, over the last two decades the town has settled down considerably and is now known as a popular gathering spot for horse-lovers and horseback riding. There are miles of horseback riding trails in the surrounding Brushy Mountains.

Geography
Love Valley is located in the Brushy Mountains of northwestern Iredell County at  (35.989376, -80.988206).

The town's area drains southwest to Snow Creek, part of the South Yadkin River watershed.

Demographics

As of the census of 2010, there were 90 people, 17 households, and 9 families residing in the town. The population density was 450.0 people per square mile (57.9/km2). There were 31 housing units at an average density of 154.0 per square mile (59.8/km2). The racial makeup of the town is 100.00% White.

There were 17 households, out of which 11.8% had children under the age of 18 living with them, 47.1% were married couples living together, 11.8% had a female householder with no husband present, and 41.2% were non-families. 41.2% of all households were made up of individuals, and 17.6% had someone living alone who was 65 years of age or older. The average household size was 1.76 and the average family size was 2.20.

In the town, the population was spread out, with 6.7% under the age of 18, 6.7% from 18 to 24, 20.0% from 25 to 44, 36.7% from 45 to 64, and 30.0% who were 65 years of age or older. The median age was 55 years. For every 100 females, there were 87.5 males. For every 100 females age 18 and over, there were 86.7 males.

The median income for a household in the town was $24,375, and the median income for a family was $25,313. Males had a median income of $0 versus $0 for females. The per capita income for the town was $9,848. There were 15.4% of families and 31.0% of the population living below the poverty line, including 50.0% of under eighteens and none of those over 64.

References

Towns in Iredell County, North Carolina
Towns in North Carolina
Populated places established in 1954